Timothy S. Jordan was a member of the Wisconsin State Assembly.

Biography
Jordan was born on December 21, 1827, in Wayne County, Indiana. During the American Civil War, he served with the 12th Wisconsin Volunteer Infantry Regiment of the Union Army.

Political career
Jordan was a member of the Assembly during the 1876 session. Additionally, he chaired the town board (similar to city council) of Union, Vernon County, Wisconsin. He was a Republican.

References

People from Wayne County, Indiana
People from Vernon County, Wisconsin
Republican Party members of the Wisconsin State Assembly
Mayors of places in Wisconsin
Wisconsin city council members
People of Wisconsin in the American Civil War
Union Army soldiers
1827 births
Year of death missing